John Smith was a British colonial governor. He was Deputy Governor of Anguilla from 1771 until 1776.

References

Deputy Governors of Anguilla
1776 deaths
Year of birth unknown